A list of films produced in South Korea in 1998:

External links
 1998 in South Korea
 1998 in South Korean music

 1998 at www.koreanfilm.org

1998
South Korean
1998 in South Korea